GCS Medical College, Hospital and Research Centre was dedicated to people by Shri Narendra Modi (Hon'ble Prime Minister of India) in 2011. This state-of-the-art infrastructure has been built by Gujarat Cancer Society in 25 acres of area.

GCS Hospital 
GCS Hospital is NABH Accredited 1000-bed Multi-Speciality Hospital which offers a spectrum of services - all medical and surgical care under one roof. GCS Hospital is empanelled with various Government Health Schemes such as - Ayushman Bharat (PM-JAY), Mukhyamantri Amrutam "MA" Yojana & "MA" Vatsalya Yojana, Chiranjeevi Yojana, Bal Sakha Yojana.

Conducting free health checkup camps, health awareness programs, blood donation camps, patient-aid for the underprivileged people are few of the activities done on a regular basis by GCSMCH with almost dedication and concern. GCSMCH conducts these activities in the different areas of East Ahmedabad & nearby places. The aim is not just to provide health services to the people but to create an environment where the whole community gets sensitized about health issues. The free health camps are organized for the people who are neither able to afford medical treatment nor have any basic knowledge regarding health & hence, in fact, these programs have been great benefits to the people who could not reach the hospital because they can’t afford that. Under Sahay Yojana (Patient-aid initiative), GCS Hospital provides free treatment and services to very poor patients who are not covered under any Government schemes.

GCS Medical College 
GCS Medical College is recognized by Medical Council of India and is affiliated to Gujarat University. The college is known for medical education through various Undergraduate (intake 150 students per year) and Postgraduate (intake around 50 students per year) degree courses. Besides imparting necessary medical and technological skills, the university also encourages students to be more active as a student-medical community to improve health conditions in the nation.

Courses 
GCS Medical college offers medical education through various undergraduate and postgraduate courses.

Facilities 

 Medical
 Library
 Auditorium
 Hostel (Boys & Girls)
 Hospital
 Transport
 Computer labs
 Sports
 Cafeteria
 Laboratory
 IT Infrastructure

References

2009 establishments in Gujarat
Educational institutions established in 2009
Medical colleges in Gujarat
Hospitals in Ahmedabad